Chewton may refer to:

Chewton, Pennsylvania, a census-designated place in the United States
Chewton, Victoria, a town in Australia
Chewton Keynsham, a hamlet in Somerset, United Kingdom
Chewton Mendip, a village in Somerset, United Kingdom
Hundred of Chewton, a historical region in Somerset, United Kingdom